Hicham Boussefiane (born 9 January 1998), simply known as Hicham, is a Moroccan footballer who plays as a right winger.

Club career
Having joined Málaga CF's youth setup in 2016 from Mohammed VI Football Academy, Rabat-born Hicham made his senior debut with the former's reserves on 27 August 2017, playing the last 32 minutes in a 1–0 Tercera División home win against CD Huétor Vega. He scored his first goal on 15 October, netting the winner in a 3–2 home defeat of Linares Deportivo.

Hicham made his first-team debut on 18 August 2018, coming on as a second-half substitute for Renato Santos in a 2–1 away win against CD Lugo in the Segunda División championship. He scored his first professional goal on 15 September, netting the last in a 3–0 home defeat of Córdoba CF.

References

External links

1998 births
Living people
Moroccan footballers
Footballers from Rabat
Association football wingers
Segunda División players
Segunda División B players
Tercera División players
Atlético Malagueño players
Málaga CF players
Morocco under-20 international footballers
Expatriate footballers in Spain
Moroccan expatriate footballers
Moroccan expatriate sportspeople in Spain